Assago ( or  ) is a town and comune in the Metropolitan City of Milan, in the northern Italian region of Lombardy.

It is home of the headquarters of Nestlé's Italian branch and the Mediolanum Forum.

Sport 
Football Teams: GS ASSAGO and O.S.M.

Twin towns
Assago is twinned with:

  Nozay, Essonne, France, since 2006
  Střelice, Czech Republic, since 2006

References